12-O-Tetradecanoylphorbol-13-acetate (TPA), also commonly known as tetradecanoylphorbol acetate, tetradecanoyl phorbol acetate, and phorbol 12-myristate 13-acetate (PMA) is a diester of phorbol. It is a potent tumor promoter often employed in biomedical research to activate the signal transduction enzyme protein kinase C (PKC). The effects of TPA on PKC result from its similarity to one of the natural activators of classic PKC isoforms, diacylglycerol. TPA is a small molecule drug.

In ROS biology, superoxide was identified as the major reactive oxygen species induced by TPA/PMA but not by ionomycin in mouse macrophages. Thus, TPA/PMA has been routinely used as an inducer for endogenous superoxide production.

TPA is also being studied as a drug in the treatment of hematologic cancer 

TPA has a specific use in cancer diagnostics as a B-cell specific mitogen in cytogenetic testing. To view the chromosomes, a cytogenetic test requires dividing cells. TPA is used to stimulate division of B-cells during cytogenetic diagnosis of B-cell cancers such as chronic lymphocytic leukemia.

TPA is also commonly used together with ionomycin to stimulate T-cell activation, proliferation, and cytokine production, and is used in protocols for intracellular staining of these cytokines.

TPA induces KSHV reactivation in PEL cell cultures via stimulation of the mitogen-activated protein kinase (MAPK)/extracellular signal-regulated kinase (ERK) pathway. The pathway involves the activation of the early-immediate viral protein RTA that contributes to the activation of the lytic cycle.

TPA was first found in  the croton plant, a shrub found in Southeast Asia, exposure to which provokes a poison ivy-like rash. It underwent a phase 1 clinical trial.

References

External links 
 
 
 

Diterpenes
Carcinogens
Acetate esters
Cyclopropanes
Cyclopentenes
Phorbol esters